Fremouw Peak is a prominent peak,  high, forming the south side of the mouth of Prebble Glacier, in the Queen Alexandra Range, Antarctica. It was named by the Advisory Committee on Antarctic Names for Edward J. Fremouw, a United States Antarctic Research Program aurora scientist at South Pole Station, 1959.

References

Mountains of the Ross Dependency
Shackleton Coast